Metamorphosis is the sixth studio album by American rock band Papa Roach. It was released by DGC/Interscope on March 24, 2009. The album was originally planned to be titled Days of War, Nights of Love, which is a lyrical quote from the song "No More Secrets" on the band's previous album, The Paramour Sessions. Subsequently, two songs on the album are titled "Days of War" and "Nights of Love". It is the first album to feature Tony Palermo on drums, who joined the band in 2007 after original drummer Dave Buckner's departure.

Background information
On May 17, 2008, Papa Roach performed two new songs at the Nashville, Tennessee Crawfish Boil, "Hanging On" and "Change or Die". "Hanging On" was later renamed to "Lifeline" after Jacoby Shaddix decided to change the chorus lyrics. A third song from the album was performed on July 1 in West Palm Beach, Florida at the Cruzan Amphitheatre, titled "I Almost Told You That I Loved You". It was then that vocalist Jacoby Shaddix announced the album's planned release date of August 26. However, Shaddix later mentioned the album's release date had been pushed to March 2009 on Pulse Radio, citing, "We want a new fresh year, a great start."

Mötley Crüe lead guitarist Mick Mars played the guitar solo on the track "Into the Light".

On October 26, 2008, the song "Hollywood Whore" was released as a music video through the band's official fan club website, before being formally released as an EP in Canada two days later. In other regions, the song became available as a digital single through iTunes.

The song "Change or Die" is featured on the video game "UFC Undisputed 2009". The song "Into the Light" is featured on the video game "NHL 10".

Reception

Initial critical response to Metamorphosis was average. At Metacritic, it carries a weighted average rating of 46 out of 100 from mainstream critics, based on five reviews. Chris Fallon of AbsolutePunk.net said about the album, "Big anthems, Jonas Brother album cover, lyrics that weave in & out of ambition-slash-unified hope and back-alley corners? Too many times the band takes one step forward and two steps back, at least showing some minimal signs of life in a dying genre built on repetition. Shaddix has a solid voice for this sound, and Horton seems to be discovering a new use for his distortion pedal, there are just far too many cliches in the ocean Papa Roach is trying to swim across, and the band can't seem to cope with their identity." Stephen Thomas Erlewine of Allmusic observes that the album has "a dire determination to its purported good times, it's riffs grinding instead of greasy, its rhythms clenched where they should be loose. While Papa Roach is a long long way from the depths of Hinder — that decade of work does give the band a professional snap, plus it never quite seems that Jacoby Shaddix's heart is into slagging that 'Hollywood Whore' he berates on the album's first single — they miss the whole point of this kind of rock & roll raunch: it should be more fun to listen to than it is to take out on the road."

Sales
The album landed at #8 in the Billboard 200, selling 44,000 copies in its first week. Despite its strong debut on the chart, Metamorphosis quickly slid out of the top 20 and charted at #35 in its second week. However, in Canada things were different. The album charted #15 in its first week and charted #1 in its second week.

Track listing

UK Edition

Japan Edition

Japan Bonus DVD

Personnel
Papa Roach
 Jacoby Shaddix - lead vocals 
 Jerry Horton - guitar, backing vocals
 Tobin Esperance - bass, backing vocals
 Tony Palermo - drums

Additional musicians
 Guitar solo on "Into the Light" by Mick Mars
 Organ on "Nights of Love" by James Michael

Production
 Produced by Jay Baumgardner
 Co-Produced by James Michael
 Additional Production by Marti Frederiksen
 Additional Production by Mitch Allan
 Audio mixing by Mike Shipley at the Animal House
 Audio mastering by Ted Jensen at Sterling Sound NYC
 Audio engineering by Casey Lewis
 Assistant engineering by Dave Colvin
 Additional engineering on "I Almost Told You That I Loved You", "Live This Down", "State of Emergency", "Lifeline", "Nights of Love", "Into the Light" "Change or Die" by James Michael

Charts

Weekly charts

Year-end charts

References

Papa Roach albums
2009 albums
Albums produced by Jay Baumgardner
Glam metal albums